James Donahue Burke (born September 18, 1925) is an American lunar settlement and exploration expert. He is known for being the first manager of the Ranger program, and considered one of the pioneers of America's space program

Early life and career
Burke was born in Los Angeles County on September 18, 1925. He grew up in Claremont, California and graduated from Webb High School in 1942.

In 1945, after graduating in mechanical engineering from California Institute of Technology, he became a U.S. naval aviator. Burke returned to Caltech to receive his MSc in aeronautics, before coming to work for JPL in 1949.

In his time in JPL, Burke was the Vega program director,  developing the third stage of the general-purpose Vega launch vehicle, which was based on the Atlas rocket.

Following JPL's transfer from the U.S. Navy to NASA, and reorganization during early 1960, the Lunar and Planetary Program was created. Burke was named deputy of the Lunar Program under Clifford Cummings, before becoming the Ranger Spacecraft Project Manager as well.

Ranger program

Burke was the first program manager of the Ranger program, a series of unmanned space missions by the United States in the 1960s whose objective was to obtain the first close-up images of the surface of the Moon. The Ranger spacecraft were designed to take images of the lunar surface, transmitting those images to Earth until the spacecraft were destroyed upon impact. Burke was in charge of spacecraft design, deep space tracking and control network, space flight operations and data reduction support systems, while the Space Science Division was in charge of the scientific experiments.
Burke could combine the technological and theoretical to integrate mechanical and electrical features to achieve the difficult technical objectives. Along with his two associates, Burke had solved the major guidance problem, velocity control, associated with solid-propellant ballistic missiles. He was recognized as one of the laboratory's most perceptive research engineers, and advanced to become deputy to Cummings on the Vega Program.

Technical difficulties and challenges, led to the failure of the first six flights. Following the first five failures, H.M. Schurmeier became project manager. The ranger program suffered an additional failure before Ranger 7 was successful.

Burke participated in many other lunar, planetary and astrophysical projects. He was a member of the human-powered flight team that won the Kremer prize.

Burke continued to work in JPL until his retirement in 2001.

Minor planet 4874 Burke, discovered by Eleanor Helin is named after him, when he retired from JPL.

Outreach and education
Burke was a faculty member of the International Space University since 1989.

Burke and his wife, Caroline (Lin), were advisers at the founding conference of the Space Generation Advisory Council during UNISPACE III in Vienna and have participated in many Space Generation activities. Burke is an Honorary Board Member of SGAC.

Burke has been involved with the Planetary Society from the beginning. He has been the technical editor of newsletter, "The Planetary Report" for many years.

Selected publications
Burke has over 129 works in 165 publications
 Burke, J, Brereton, R, Muller, P. 1970," Desert Stream Channels resembling Lunar Sinuous Rilles". In Nature, Vol. 225, 23 March,  pp1234–1236, (28 March 1970); doi:10.1038/2251234a0
 Burke, J. 1985, "Merits of a Lunar Polar Base Location". In Mendell, W. (Ed.). Lunar Bases and Space Activities of the 21st Century, Lunar and Planetary Institute.
 Burke, J. 2001, "Moon".  In Encyclopædia Britannica, 24th edition.
 Burke, J. 2008, "Moon". In McGraw-Hill Encyclopedia of Science and Technology, 10th ed.

References

External links
 Jim Burke - Looking Back 35 Years, Interview on the Planetary Society Radio
 James Burke on the Space Show, Episode 189, Jan 24, 2004

1925 births
Living people
NASA people
Early spaceflight scientists
20th-century American engineers
California Institute of Technology alumni
People from Claremont, California
Engineers from California